Jessica Hahn (born July 7, 1959) is an American model and actress. She frequently appeared on The Howard Stern Show throughout the late 1980s and into the 2000s.

Jim Bakker scandal
Hahn first came to public attention following Jim Bakker's announcement on March 19, 1987, that he was stepping down as head of PTL Satellite Network and Heritage USA, pending the imminent disclosure of a sexual encounter between the two of them. According to Hahn, on the afternoon of December 6, 1980, when she was a 21-year-old church secretary, she was drugged and raped by Bakker and another preacher, John Wesley Fletcher. Hahn was given a $279,000 pay-off for her silence, which was paid with PTL's funds to Hahn through Bakker associate Roe Messner. Bakker, who made all of the financial decisions for the PTL organization, allegedly kept two sets of books to conceal the accounting irregularities. Reporters from The Charlotte Observer, led by Charles Shepard, investigated and published a series of articles regarding the PTL organization's finances. This precipitated Bakker's resignation and the publication of Hahn's claims. In his 1997 book, I Was Wrong, Bakker disputed Hahn's account, claiming that he was "set up" and that the sex was consensual.

Acting and modeling career
After the public revelation of the Bakker scandal, Hahn posed nude for Playboy (November 1987, December 1987 and September 1988) and videos and appeared in several television shows, including Married... with Children. She was also known for her frequent appearances on The Howard Stern Show throughout the late 1980s and into the 2000s.

Personal life
Hahn was born in Massapequa, New York and graduated from Massapequa High School. She had a relationship with comedian Sam Kinison and appeared in his music video for "Wild Thing" in 1988. In 1991, she began a relationship with the co-creator of Married...with Children, Ron Leavitt, which continued until his death in 2008.

In December 2017, Hahn disclosed that she is married to Frank Lloyd (a film stuntman), is no longer active in show business, and lives on a ranch north of Los Angeles. Hahn remains a committed Christian.

Filmography
 "Wild Thing" music video by Sam Kinison (1988)
 "Critical Mass" music video by Nuclear Assault (1989)
 Married... with Children as Ricki (1 episode, 1991)
 "Runnin" music video by Brittiana, directed by Bryan Michael Stoller 1992
 Bikini Summer II (1992) as Marilyn
 Dream On as Reporter 1 (1 episode, 1992)
 Blossom as Girl #1 (1 episode, 1992)
 Amanda and the Alien (1995) (TV) as TV Host
 Unhappily Ever After as Miss Taylor (3 episodes, 1995)
 Hollywood: The Movie (1996) (V) as Esther

References

Further reading

External links
 

1959 births
Living people
People from Massapequa, New York
Assemblies of God people
Female models from New York (state)
Actresses from New York (state)
21st-century American women